Biophysical Reviews and Letters is a quarterly peer-reviewed scientific journal that covering the areas of experimental and mathematical biophysics, including, physical aspects of structural and molecular cell biology, bioenergetics, computational biophysics, bioinformatics, biofunctional and bioinspired materials, biomimetic materials, and fundamental issues related to life sciences. The journal occasionally publishes special issues on specific topics. It was established in 2006 and is published by World Scientific.

Abstracting and indexing 
The journal is abstracted and indexed in:
 BIOSIS Previews
 Chemical Abstracts Service
 EMBASE
 Inspec
 Scopus

References

External links 
 

Biophysics journals
Publications established in 2006
World Scientific academic journals
English-language journals
Quarterly journals